The black-tailed hairy dwarf porcupine (Coendou melanurus) is a porcupine species from the family Erethizontidae. It is found in Brazil, Colombia, Ecuador, French Guiana, Guyana, Suriname and Venezuela.

This species was formerly sometimes assigned to Sphiggurus, a genus no longer recognized since genetic studies showed it to be polyphyletic. Its closest relatives are the frosted hairy dwarf porcupine (Coendou pruinosus), the brown hairy dwarf porcupine (Coendou vestitus) and the streaked dwarf porcupine (Coendou ichillus).

References 

 Natureserve.org

Mammals of Brazil
Mammals of Colombia
Mammals of Ecuador
Mammals of French Guiana
Mammals of Guyana
Mammals of Suriname
Mammals of Venezuela
Coendou
Mammals described in 1842